Burnet may refer to:

Life forms 
 Burnet moth, the Zygaenidae family of diurnal moths
 Six-spot burnet (Z. filipendulae), a red-spotted species endemic to Europe and Anatolia
 Burnet (plant), the perennial genus Sanguisorba
Salad burnet (S. minor), a herb with edible, ferny leaves
 Burnet saxifrage or "lesser burnet", an unrelated plant species of similar appearance
 Acaena, a herb genus including southern South America's "greater burnet" and "lesser burnet"

Places 
 Burnet, Texas, United States
 Burnet County, Texas

Other uses 
HMS Burnet (K348), a British-commissioned warship in WWII
 Professor Burnet, a Pokémon character

People named Burnet
 Burnet (surname), people with the surname
 Burnet Reading (1749–1838), English engraver

See also 
 Burnett (disambiguation)
 Burnette (disambiguation)